Rudá Franco (born 25 July 1986) is a water polo player from Brazil. He won a bronze medal at the 2011 Pan American Games and competed at the 2016 Summer Olympics.

References

Brazilian male water polo players
Living people
1986 births
Water polo players at the 2011 Pan American Games
Olympic water polo players of Brazil
Water polo players at the 2016 Summer Olympics
Pan American Games medalists in water polo
Pan American Games bronze medalists for Brazil
Water polo players at the 2019 Pan American Games
Medalists at the 2019 Pan American Games
Medalists at the 2011 Pan American Games
People from Bauru
Sportspeople from São Paulo (state)
21st-century Brazilian people